Lyubov Ivanovna Mlotkovskaya (1804-1866) was a Russian stage actor. She was engaged in a number of provincial theatres and travelling theatres in 1823–1866, most notably the Kharkov theatre, and played an considerable part in Russian theatre life during the first half of the 19th-century. She has been referred to as the most popular actress of the provincial theatre in the 1830s and as the greatest actress of the provincial theatre of her time. She is most known for her role as Ophelia, which she famously created in Kiev and Kharkov 1838–1842, but she was also known to favor and benefit the works of Shchepkin and Mochalov at the Russian stage.

References 

 Дмитриев, Ю., Клинчин А. Павел Степанович Мочалов; заметки о театре, письма, стихи, пьесы. Современники о П.С. Мочалове. — М.: Искусство, 1953. — С. 283. — 438 с

1804 births
1866 deaths
19th-century actresses from the Russian Empire
Russian stage actresses